The Swanson-Fahlin SF-1 was a high wing, two seat cabin aircraft with a small radial engine, designed in the United States and first flown in 1934. Only one was built.

Design and development

At the start of the collaboration between Swen Swanson and Ole Fahlin, Swanson had already designed several aircraft and Fahlin was better known for propeller design. Lacking manufacturing space of their own, and as they had chosen to design a smaller, less powerful development of the Swanson Coupe light aircraft around a Pobjoy engine, the facilities of the U.S. Pobjoy distributors, Nicholas-Beazely, provided a natural space for its construction.

The SF-1 was a high, cantilever, gull wing cabin aircraft of all-wood and canvas construction. The wing was mounted on the fuselage according to Swanson's patented design, which left the central section over the cabin clear, with a short, strut-supported, high dihedral part of the wing immediately outboard. In plan the wings were straight-tapered, with an unswept leading edge and rounded tips.

Its air-cooled, seven cylinder,  Pobjoy R radial engine was supplied with its own long-chord cowling which was merged smoothly into the forward fuselage. Gearing off-set the propeller drive shaft upwards. Behind, the SF-1's cabin for two, sitting side-by-side, was under the wing and was accessed via external steps and wide doors. At the rear the tail was conventional, with a near-triangular fin and deep, rounded rudder and a tailplane mounted near the top of the fuselage.  The elevators had a cut-out for rudder movement.

The SF-1's landing gear had independent legs with their struts enclosed in streamlined fairings and braced with streamlined tie-rods. A pneumatic tailwheel was mounted at the extreme rear fuselage.

Operational history
The only SF-1 was first flown in 1934.

Variants
 Swanson-Fahlin SF-2 An enlarged, more powerful variant with a Plymouth car engine.

Specifications

References

High-wing aircraft
Single-engined tractor aircraft
1930s United States sport aircraft